Barend "Ben" Bril (16 July 1912 – 11 September 2003) was a Dutch boxer who competed in the 1928 Amsterdam Summer Olympics in Flyweight boxing, and became an accomplished European boxing referee and judge in the 1960s.

Early life and career
Bril was born in Valkenburgstraat, a poor section of Amsterdam to Jewish parents Abraham Bril and Klaartie Moffie on 16 July 1912.   He was one of six children of a struggling family supported primarily by their father's work as a fisherman. Bril competed in the 1928 Summer Olympics at age 15 in his home town, finishing fifth in the flyweight class, just out of medal contention.  In his Olympic competition, after a first round bye, he defeated Myles McDonagh of Ireland, before losing to Buddy Lebanon of South Africa.

Four years later he was barred from the 1932 Summer Olympics because the Dutch Olympic Committee was led by a member of the Dutch Nazi party.  He later boycotted the 1936 Games in Berlin.

In his boxing career before the war, beginning in 1928, he won the Dutch Amateur National Championship a total of eight times.  As a high point in his amateur career, he won a gold medal at the 1935 Maccabiah Games, held in Tel Aviv, Israel.

Internment at Bergen-Belsen concentration camp
During the German occupation of the Netherlands after 1940, Bril, his wife Celia and son were forced to go into hiding above what was once his family's bakery, but in 1942 were arrested by Nazi sympathiser, Jan Olij a neighbor, whose father, Sam Olij, had boxed together with Bril in the 1928 Olympics.  Around 1942, he was first sent to the Vught Transit Camp, a concentration camp in Southern Holland with deplorable conditions, located Southeast of his home in Amsterdam.  Once deported to Northern Germany and interned at the Bergen-Belsen concentration camp, Bril was able to get a job, and then a promotion to the position of Blockälteste, which put him in charge of his barrack.  Looking to survive, he was selected to box in the camp, where he let known German boxers defeat him.  Four of his brothers and a sister died in the camps.  All but one of the siblings were married with children.  Ben, his wife, and his younger brother Herrie survived the war.  Herrie Bril died in Rotterdam on 6 August 1966. Sam Olij was eventually jailed and died in the Netherlands in 1975, while Jan fled to Argentina and died there in 1996.

Work as a referee

From 1963-74, Bril found fame working as a boxing referee for many important matches throughout Europe.  Most of the fights he refereed were title fights for the European Boxing Union, that brought him to matches in Berlin, Vienna, Madrid, Paris, London, and throughout Europe.  Bril also refereed Olympic fights, overseeing the matches of George Frazier at the 1964 Summer Olympics in Tokyo, George Foreman at the 1968 Summer Olympics in Mexico City, and for Teófilo Stevenson a Cuban heavyweight, who competed in boxing in three Summer Olympics from 1972-1980.  He also refereed boxing matches for the 1973 Maccabiah Games.

Bril and his wife Celia had one child Ab Ben, who lives in Zandvoort with his wife Wilma. Ab Ben and Wilma have one son, Benno, who also lives in Zandvoort.

Bril died on 11 September 2003, at the age of 91 at the Beth Shalom Retirement Home in Amsterdam, and was buried at the Jewish cemetery of Muiderberg.  He is still considered an heroic figure in the Netherlands.  After his death, the Ben Bril Memorial Boxing Gala, which continues today, was inaugurated to honor his memory.  The event features a series of boxing matches and is held every October in Amsterdam.

In October 2006 Bril's biography Ben Bril - Davidsster als Ereteken, by Ed van Opzeeland was published. The English translation of the title is Ben Bril - Decorated with a Star of David. The Dutch swimmer Erica Terpstra handed out the first copy of the book to Ben's only son Albert Bril.

Select fights officiated by Bril

|-
| align="center" colspan=8|Primarily EBU European Bouts, 1963-73 
|-
| align="center" style="border-style: none none solid solid; background: #e3e3e3"|Result
| align="center" style="border-style: none none solid solid; background: #e3e3e3"|Opponents
| align="center" style="border-style: none none solid solid; background: #e3e3e3"|Date
| align="center" style="border-style: none none solid solid; background: #e3e3e3"|Location
| align="center" style="border-style: none none solid solid; background: #e3e3e3"|Duration
| align="center" style="border-style: none none solid solid; background: #e3e3e3"|Notes
|-
| Aldridge Won
| Laslo Papp vs. George Aldridge
| 6 Feb 1963
| Vienna
| 15 Round TKO
| EBU Eur. Middle Title
|-
| Rollo Won
| Minmoun Ben Ali vs. Pierro Rollo
| 19 Jul 1963
| Madrid
| 15 Round
| EBU Eur. Bantam Title
|-
| Preberg Won
| Ivan Prebeg vs. Karl Mildenberger
| 15 Jun 1966
| Frankfort, Ger.
| 15 Round
| EBU Eur. Heavy Title
|-
| Walker Won
| Billy Walker vs. Karl Mildenberger
| 21 Mar 1967
| London, UK
| 8 Round TKO 
| EBU Eur. Heavy Title
|-
| Swift Won
| Sandro Mazzinghi vs. Wally Swift
| 9 Sep 1967
| Milan, Ital.
| 6 Round TKO
| EBU Super Welter Title
|-
| Zech Won
| Karl Mildenberger vs. Gerhard Zech
| 30 Dec 1967
| Berlin, Ger.
| 15 Round
| EBU Europ. Heavy Title
|-
| Tomasoni Won
| Henry Cooper vs. Pierro Tomasoni
| 13 Mar 1969
| Rome, Ital.
| 5th Round KO
| EBU Europ. Heavy Title
|-
| Duran Won
| Tom Boggs vs. Carlo Duran
| 11 Sep 1969
| Copenhagen
| 15 Rounds
| EBU Europ. Middle Title
|-
| Bossi Won
| Yohann Orsolics vs. Carmello Bossi
| 9 Apr 1970
| Vienna, Aus
| 15 Rounds
| EBU Europ. Welter Title
|-
| Fullmer Won
| Tom Bogs vs. Don Fullmer
| 11 Feb 1971
| Copenhagen
| 10 Rounds
| 
|-
| Duivenbode Won
| Ruddi Lubbers vs. Bas Van Duivenbode
| 17 May 1971
| Amsterdam
| 12 Round
| Dutch Heavy Title
|-
| Duran Won
| Jean Claude Bouttier vs. Carlo Duran
| 9 June 1971
| Paris
| 15 Rounds UD
| EBU European Middle TitleBril acted as Judge
|-
| Legra Won
| Jose Legra vs. Tommy Glencross
| 17 May 1972
| Birmingham, England
| 15 Rounds SD
| For Europ. Feather title
|-
| Franco Zurlo Won
| Franco Zurlo vs. Johnny Clark
| 17 April 1973
| London, UK
| 15 Round 
| Vac. EBU Europ. Bantam Title

References

External links

1912 births
2003 deaths
Bergen-Belsen concentration camp survivors
Boxers at the 1928 Summer Olympics
Boxers at the 1935 Maccabiah Games
Dutch Jews
Jewish boxers
Jewish Dutch sportspeople
Maccabiah Games boxers of the Netherlands
Maccabiah Games gold medalists for the Netherlands
Olympic boxers of the Netherlands
Boxers from Amsterdam
Dutch male boxers
Flyweight boxers